Dr. Erick Christopher Jones Sr. is an industrial engineer and professor in the Department of Industrial, Manufacturing, and Systems Engineering at the University of Texas at Arlington. He is an expert in radio-frequency identification (RFID), quality engineering, and Lean Six Sigma. He is the George and Elizabeth Pickett Endowed Professor, as well as Associate Dean for Graduate Studies in the College of Engineering at the University of Texas at Arlington (UTA). Jones joined UTA in 2010 after eight years at the University of Nebraska – Lincoln, where he rose to the rank of Associate Professor with tenure. He previously served as the deputy director of the UT Arlington's homeland security focused University Center Security Advances via Applied Nanotechnology (SAVANT) Center and he serves as the current director of the Radio Frequency & Auto Identification (RAID) labs at UTA. Jones was the program director of The National Science Foundation's (NSF) Engineering Research Centers. He is currently Chair of the Supply Chain Technology Committee of International Supply Chain Education Alliance's (ISCEA) International Standards Board (IISB) and Editor in Chief of the International Supply Chain Technology Journal (ISCTJ).

Jones's background led him to be invited to the National Science Foundation as program officer for the largest engineering investment in the country, the Engineering Research Center (ERC). He also worked in the largest fellowship program in the country, the NSF's Graduate Research Fellowships Program (GRFP). Jones served as a rotating program director at the NSF.

Education 
Jones graduated from Texas A&M University with a bachelor's degree in industrial engineering in May 1993. He later earned a master's degree from University of Houston, where his thesis was "Turnover of Part-Time Hourly Employees in an Industrial Service Company"   
under the guidance of Dr. Christopher Chung in May 1996. He further went on to obtain a PhD in industrial engineering from the University of Houston while concurrently working in the industry. Under the guidance of his advisor Chung, he worked on the topic "A Predictive SPC Model for Determining Cognitive Voluntary Turnover before Physical Departure"  and successfully conferred the Ph.D. in August 2003.

Industry background 
He has held positions in industry that include Industrial Engineering Specialist, Director of Engineering, Consultant and Project Manager, and Executive Manager of a "Big 5" Accounting firm, and executive manager for United Parcel Service (UPS), Tompkins Associates, Academy Sports and Outdoors, and Arthur Andersen. He managed teams and operations as small as 3 people and as large as 500 people. He has managed projects implementing warehouse management systems (WMS) and enterprise resources planning (ERP) system, designing and constructing new facilities and re-engineering Fortune 1000 organizations. Operations managed include strategic systems deployment, teams of large-scale distribution operation, and human resources at an executive level. He is an expert in the field of supply chain optimization, distribution logistics, and inventory control. His contribution has laid foundation for our modern understanding of the Internet of Things (IOT), Blockchain, RFID, Auto ID and Supply Chain Technologies.

Research 
Jones' research interests are mainly in the field of RFID and its applications and Lean Six Sigma. However, Jones's research also covers various other topics like supply-chain technology, logistics, operations research, engineering, training, transportation and healthcare. He has received external funding from agencies like the NSF NASA, TexasMRC and internal funding in support of his research pursuits. He has also worked with undergraduate, graduate students and other professors on different research projects under RAID LABS at The University of Texas at Arlington.

Development of RFID technologies 
Jones has emerged as an industry leader in the RFID space as a result of his extensive work in forwarding the engineering aspects of the technology and the public adoption of the same in various socially relevant sectors. Having spearheaded a myriad of innovations in the field including but not limited to boosting applications of additive manufacturing in cyber-enabled manufacturing systems and integrating RFID in linear asset management, Jones now works on expanding RFID technologies towards satellites, cameras, and other data capturing technologies to create a "smart" planet.

Jones has also been active in enriching the RFID technological toolkit with his focused research on RFID integration in cell phones and other automated monitoring systems, resulting in numerous potential new intellectual property developments. Furthermore, his presence in academia remains prominent through his personal body of work which includes several journal publications, book authorships and conference presentations. He also serves as the Editor in Chief of the International Supply Chain Technology Journal (ISCTJ).

Process and supply-chain automation 
Jones' work heavily centers around integrated supply chain systems engineering with particular emphasis on manufacturing, automation for inventory control, and facilities and logistics planning. Through his contributions to Six Sigma Manufacturing and Management and Knowledge Worker productivity coupled with his involvement at RAID labs, he has brought new-age manufacturing and cyber solutions to many industries. Most notable of which are his collaborations with NASA towards implementing a ‘first of its kind’ RFID integration leveraged towards reducing inventory loss and record better replenishment accuracy. The technology was later ported onto the International space station which was met with positive affirmations from the astronauts on board. Additionally, Jones’ work has also been used in other socially relevant supply chains including ones in the essential manufacturing and healthcare system.

Books 
He has also published over 241 transcripts, books and publications and has written, edited, and published dozens of peer-reviewed articles and conference papers. Some of his most notable books are RFID and Auto-ID in Planning and Logistics: A Practical Guide for Military UID Applications, RFID in Logistics: A Practical Introduction, and Quality Management for Organizations Using Lean Six Sigma Techniques.

 "RFID and Auto-ID in Planning and Logistics", E. C. Jones and Christopher A. Chung
 "Modern Quality for Organizations Using Lean Six Sigma Techniques", E. C. Jones.
"RFID in Logistics:A Practical Introduction",. E. C. Jones and Christopher A. Chung.
 "Supply Chain Engineering and Logistics Handbook: Inventory and Production Control", E.C. Jones.

Industrial handbooks 
 Tracked, What You Should Know About RFID, Internet of Things, Big Data and Data Security: The Official RFIDSCM Certification Handbook; Engineering Version by Jones, E. C., Gray, B., Wijemanne, M and Bolton, J,
 Tracked, What Everyone Should Know About Invisible Inventory, Monitoring and Tracking, The Official RFIDSCM Certification Handbook; Engineering Version by Jones, E. C., Gray, B and Armstrong, H.
 The Six Sigma Trap, What you should know about Six Sigma that your company is not telling you:  The Official ISCEA CLSSYB Certification Book by Jones, E. C., and Armstrong, H.A.
Clampitt, H.G., and Edited by E. C. Jones, “RFID Certification Textbook,” PWD Group, January 2006. Second Edition, May 2006, Third Edition, American RFID Solutions, Arlington Heights, IL, May 2007

Leadership positions in international and national organizations 

 Committee member, National Academics of Science, Engineering and Medicine (NASEM), "Potential Impacts of COVID – 19 on the Careers of Women in Science, Engineering and Medicine",  August 18, 2020 – March 31, 2021
 President of ISCEA International Standards Board (IISB) – ISCEA, July 2020 – Present
 President, IISE Work Systems Division, July 2020 – Present
 Chairperson, Program - International Supply Chain Education Alliance RFID Supply Chain Manager (ISCEA RFID SCM) Certification Committee, 2007 – Present
 Board, Chief Diversity Equity and Inclusion Delegate (ASEE CDEI) - American Society of Engineering Educators, Engineering Economics Division, 2015 – 2023
 Program Chair, Division -American Society of Engineering Educators, Engineering Management Division, 2006 through 2007

Fellowships 
 National Academies of Science, Engineering, and Mathematics, Jefferson Science Fellow, 2021
Sigma Xi, Fellow, June 2020
 Institute of Industrial and Systems Engineers, Fellow, May 2020
 African Scientific Institute (ASI), notable Fellow, 2019
 International Supply Chain Education Alliance (ISCEA) Fellow, August 10, 2017
 William J. Fulbright Foundation Specialist Scholar, 2011
 Alfred P. Sloan Foundation, MPS Scholar, 2003

Awards and honors 
The Academy of Medicine, Engineering, and Science of Texas (TAMEST) Protégé, 2020 
National Role Model Administrator Award, Minority Access Inc., 2018.
George and Elizabeth Pickett Endowed Professor, University of Texas at Arlington, 2017.
 William J. Fulbright Scholar in Mexico 2013
Fulbright Mexico Scholars Specialist, Engineering Education in Mexico, 2011.
Innovative Use of Instructional Technology Teaching Award, 2007.
 College of Engineering Teaching Award Assistant Professor, 2007
 College of Engineering Service Award Assistant Professor, 2006.
 Omaha World Herald Featured article about RFID Lab, March 18, 2006.
 College of Engineering Research Award Assistant Professor, 2006.
 Alfred P. Sloan Underrepresented Minority Ph.D. Program Fellow, 2001.
 NACME Undergraduate Award, 1990, 1991, 1992.            
 Presidential Achievement Award (Undergraduate), 1988–1992.

References

External links 
 

Living people
Texas A&M University alumni
University of Houston alumni
University of Texas at Arlington faculty
1970 births